Angela Morant (born 15 January 1941 in Warwickshire, England) is an English actress best known for playing Octavia Minor in the 1976 BBC television adaptation of I, Claudius, and Barbara Harrison in the soap opera Brookside.

Career
Other TV credits include A.D., Dixon of Dock Green, Callan, Inspector Morse, Bergerac and The Bill. She was also featured in the Lord Peter Wimsey series Have His Carcase.

Her film roles include the lead in the 1979 film Victims.

Personal life
Morant attended Chipping Campden Grammar School. Her brother was actor Richard Morant. She was a niece of actors Bill and Linden Travers, and a cousin of actress Penelope Wilton and Susan Travers.

She was the first wife of actor Ben Kingsley, with whom she had two children: Thomas and Jasmin Bhanji.

References

External links
 

English television actresses
Living people
1941 births
People from Warwickshire